Dubbed and Freq'd: A Remix Project is the ninth album released by Christian recording artist tobyMac. It was released by ForeFront Records on March 23, 2012. The album contains remix versions of songs from tobyMac's albums Portable Sounds and Tonight.

The album art is a mixture of the radio waves from the Portable Sounds album cover mixed with the buildings on the Tonight album cover.

Critical reception

Track listing

Notes
Tracks 6 and 10 are on the deluxe edition of Tonight.
Tracks 8 and 11 are on the iTunes Store version of Portable Sounds.

Charts

Weekly charts

Year-end charts

References

TobyMac albums
2012 remix albums
ForeFront Records remix albums
Christian electronic dance music albums